Kagnew may refer to:

 Kagnew, a neighbourhood part of the district of Tiravolo in Asmara
 Kagnew Station, a United States Army installation in Asmara
 Kagnew Battalion, part of the 1st Division Imperial Bodyguard sent by Emperor Haile Selassie as part of the United Nations forces in the Korean War